Tomares is a genus of lycaenid butterflies. They are presently the only genus in the tribe Tomarini. As not all Theclinae have been assigned to tribes, this is preliminary however. The species are found in the Palearctic.

Species
 Tomares ballus (Fabricius, 1787) - Provence hairstreak or cardenillo - Iberian Peninsula, Northern Africa, Mediterranean France
 Tomares callimachus (Eversmann, 1848) Iran, Iraq, Caucasus
 Tomares desinens Nekrutenko & Effendi, 1980 Azerbaijan
 Tomares fedtschenkoi (Erschoff, 1874) Afghanistan, northern Pakistan
 Tomares mauretanicus (Lucas, 1849) - Moroccan hairstreak - northern Africa
 Tomares nogelii (Herrich-Schäffer, 1851) Romania, Ukraine, Turkey, Syria, Lebanon, Palestine
 Tomares romanovi (Christoph, 1882) Armenia, Turkey, Iran
 Tomares telemachus Zhdanko, 2000 Kopet-Dagh
 Tomares fedtschenkoi (Erschoff, 1874) Uzbekistan

References

External links
Butterfly Conservation Armenia

Theclinae
Lycaenidae genera
Taxa named by Jules Pierre Rambur
Taxa described in 1840